Bömbögör (Dome) is a sum (district) of Bayankhongor Province in southern Mongolia. In 2006, its population was 2,584.

References 

Populated places in Mongolia
Districts of Bayankhongor Province